Caroline Henderson may refer to:

 Caroline Henderson (singer) (born 1962), Danish–Swedish pop and jazz singer
 Caroline Henderson (journalist) (born 1985), Scottish broadcast journalist
 Caroline Henderson (author) (1877–1966), American farmer and writer
 Caroline Henderson Griffiths (1861–1937), née Henderson, American diplomat's wife and philanthropist